Olga Breeskin Torres (September 22, 1951) is a Mexican violinist, dancer and actress. She was one of the most famous Mexican vedettes in 1970s and 1980s. Since her conversion to Christianity, she has only presented herself as a violinist.

Early life
Olga Breeskin was born in Mexico City. She is the daughter of Ukrainian violinist and conductor Elias Breeskin. She and her brother as children learned to play the violin from their father. When Breeskin was 13 years old; she and her brother were forced to support the family and began to play their violins for tips in restaurants. Breeskin later confessed that she kept some of the tip money for herself by hiding it in her shoe. Later, Ernesto Valz, the owner of a Mexico City night-club chain, discovered Breeskin playing her violin for tips during lunch. Recognizing her talent and her natural beauty, he hired her to perform in many of his nightclubs and created a nightclub act for her.

Career
Breeskin rose to fame in the 1970s for her cabaret act, where she danced and shimmied in French-cut leotards while playing the violin. She became the headliner in the nightclub "Belvedere", located in the penthouse of the Hotel Continental. (It was previously known as the Hilton Hotel). Her Hotel Continental nightclub act was based on a Las Vegas-style show that had numerous back-up dancers and a full show band to accompany Breeskin. The opening song for her show was "Todos Queremos Ver A Olga (We all Want to See Olga)". The television network Televisa, developed a 30-second TV commercial, where Olga wore a French-cut leotard with dangly sequined ribbon strips that flew away from her body as she spun around, she stopped, put her hand on her hip and with the other hand motioned "to come here." It was a lusty commercial for conservative Mexico. But Mexico was hypnotized with Breeskin's charms. For years, every night her performances were sold out. Nightclubs led to films. Her most recognizable movie was Nora la rebelde. She was considered for many years the number one female entertainer in Mexico. The Mexican press called her "The Number One" or "Super Olga". But the Hotel Continental was completely destroyed in the 1985 Mexico City earthquake. In the 1990s, Breeskin appeared in some television programs and Mexican telenovelas, before moving to Las Vegas.

Currently Breeskin presently lives and works in Las Vegas, NV. She has a popular radio show and occasionally performs her nightclub act. On September 5, 2014 Breeskin performed for the Alonzo De Leon Middle School orchestra class. Honors students were delighted by her.

In 2016, Breeskin, along with other vedettes like Lyn May, Rossy Mendoza, Wanda Seux and Princesa Yamal, stars in the documentary film Beauties of the Night, by the filmmaker María José Cuevas.

Personal life
When she married a New York dancer, Joey Doucette, the Mexican press asked her why she married an American instead of Mexican. Her reply was, "A Mexican husband would never allow me to wear a postage-stamp size costume." Joey and Breeskin had one child, Alan. Later Breeskin opened a clinic for research and care for asthmatic children in Las Vegas, Nevada.

Conversion 
After facing the death of her mother and falling in depression due to a life of addiction to alcohol, drugs, and gambling, in 2007, Breeskin attended a religious meeting and became a born again Christian. She has been sharing her testimony at Christian services ever since. Now she plays at Churches and Christian meetings.

Filmography

Films
 México de noche (1968)
 Los desalmados (1971)
 Elena y Raquel (1971)
 Me he de comer esa tuna (1972)
 Lo que más queremos (1972)
 Bikinis y rock (1972)
 La disputa (1974)
 El padrino...es mi compadre (1975)
 La loca de los milagros (1975)
 Eva, ¿qué hace ese hombre en tu cama? (1975)
 El compadre más padre (1976)
 Nora la rebelde (1979)
 Beauties of the Night (2016)

Television
 Tú y yo (1996) .... Lucrecia Álvarez Albarran
 Al final del arco iris (1982) .... Elsa Rivera
 Rina (1977) .... Silvia
 El amor tiene cara de mujer (1971) .... Milena del Real
 El chofer (1974) .... Nora

References

External links
 
 
 Christian Testimony of Olga Breeskin (In Spanish)

1951 births
Living people
Actresses from Mexico City
Mexican people of Russian descent
Mexican people of Ukrainian descent
Mexican female dancers
Mexican violinists
Mexican film actresses
Mexican vedettes
Mexican telenovela actresses
Mexican Christians
Converts to Christianity
21st-century violinists